Hart High School may refer to:

William S. Hart High School (California), Newhall, Santa Clarita, California
Hart High School (Michigan), Hart, Michigan
Hart County High School (Kentucky), Munfordville, Kentucky
Hart County High School (Georgia), Hartwell, Georgia
Hart Junior-Senior High School, Hart, Texas